Janaki Sharan Sah is a Nepalese politician. He is a member of Provincial Assembly of Madhesh Province from Loktantrik Samajbadi Party, Nepal. Sah is a resident of Loharpatti, Mahottari.

References

Living people
1963 births
Madhesi people
21st-century Nepalese politicians
Members of the Provincial Assembly of Madhesh Province
Loktantrik Samajwadi Party, Nepal politicians